Bozorg, or Gozorg meaning Great in Persian, may refer to:

Bozorg, Hormozgan, a village in Hormozgan Province, Iran
Agha Bozorg Mosque, an historical mosque in Kashan, Iran
Shahr-e Bozorg, a village in Badakhshan Province in north-eastern Afghanistan
Agha Bozorg Tehrani (1876–1970), Shia marja from Hawza Elmiye Najaf
Bozorg Alavi (1904–1997), influential Iranian writer, novelist, and political intellectual
Jayezeye Bozorg, a 2005 Iranian TV series directed by Mehran Modiri

See also
 Bozorgmehr, legendary Sassanian prime-minister of Persia
 Buzurg (disambiguation)